Laguna Beach High School is a 4-year public high school located in Laguna Beach, California. It is the only high school in the Laguna Beach Unified School District. It was established in 1934 and is accredited by the Western Association of Schools and Colleges.

History

Prior to 1923, no high school existed in Orange county. That year Santa Ana started adding post-eighth grade courses to their regular instructional program. By 1892, the Santa Ana High School was formally accredited by the University of California as the county's first high school. Fullerton was established in 1893, Anaheim in 1898. Still, high school education was not required in California until state legislation in 1919 that mandated that all elementary school districts affiliate with a high school district by September 1921. Rather than join Santa Ana, the Laguna School District joined with four other elementary school districts to form the Tustin Union High School District. This new high school was located on the site of the current Tustin High School more than 20 miles from Laguna Beach. Laguna Beach finally established a separate high school district in 1933 and on Tuesday, September 11, 1934, Laguna Beach High School opened with an enrollment of 157 students in a new wing constructed as part of the existing Laguna Elementary School facility [1928]. In 1935, the K-5 portion of the school was relocated to a new school built across Park Avenue. North Gym opened in 1935, the 1st floor of the high school Library building opened in 1954 and the 2nd floor Science rooms were added in 1960. Dugger Gym and Guyer Field were added in 1962 and Administration was constructed in 1964 on the site of the old 1908 2-room schoolhouse. Major renovations occurred in 1993 with new classrooms, pool and a facelift. Another major remodel and expansion occurred in 2003–05.

Student demographics
As of the 2021–22 school year, the ethnic makeup of the school is 71.8% White, 12.4% Hispanic, 0.8% African-American, 1.1% Filipino, 5.8% Asian, 0.1% Pacific Islander, 0.3% American Indian/Alaskan Native and 7.7% multiple/no response.

Four-year enrollment has varied from a low of 638 students in 1989–90 to a high of 1,200 in 1974–75.

Recognition
Laguna was named a National Blue Ribbon School in 2008. It was also recognized as a California Distinguished School in 2007 and 2012, placing the school among the top 5% of the state.

Athletics

Laguna teams were originally called the Breakers but the community already had a reputation as an art colony even before the establishing of the Festival of Arts 1932 and the famous Pageant of the Masters 1935. Civic pride with Laguna's art community culminated in a student body vote on June 4, 1936, to change the nickname to "Artists" after only 19 months as the Breakers. In 2003, the student body voted to return to the "Breakers" nickname. Girls' Sports were initially under the Girls' Athletic Association with limited interscholastic competition. The Southern Section CIF initiated girls' team sport playoffs beginning with Volleyball in 1972. Boys' and Girls' league competition and sports administration were unified in 1974

Fall Sports: (With 1st CIF Season) include Football (1934) Boys' Water Polo (1964), Boys' Cross County (1961) Girls' Cross County (1974), Girls' Tennis (1974) Girls' Golf (1999) Winter Sports: Boys' Basketball (1935), Boys' Soccer (1976), Girls' Basketball (1974), Girls' Soccer (1982), Girls' Water Polo (1998), Wrestling (2018) Spring Sports: Baseball (1938), Boys' Golf (1952), Boys Lacrosse (2018), Girls Lacrosse (2018), Boys' Swimming (1962), Boys' Tennis (1935), Boys' Track (1935), Boys' Volleyball (1972), Girls' Swimming (1975), Girls' Track (1975), Softball (1982–2007, 2011–). Laguna also has a co-ed Surf team (1987) and Sand Volleyball (Girls: since Spring 2014, Boys: since Fall 2014).

Laguna Beach has success in sports until the rapid urbanization of Orange County in the late 1950s resulted in Laguna becoming the smallest public high school in the county. 
In Cross Country, the Breakers' boys' cross country team won the state championship in 1989, 2004, 2009 and 2018. Eric Hulst has been Laguna's only Boys' State Track champion winning the 2-mile (3200M) in 1975 and 1976 setting the State record in 1976. Rennie Durand was the Girls' 1982 State Track Champion in the 800M

Overall, the Breakers have won 48 Southern Section titles in Boys' and Girls' athletics, 8 State Regional CIF titles, and four State titles. Fourteen of the 48 section titles have been at the highest level. League affiliation for 2022-23: Football: Pac 4 League in the Golden West Conference; Boys & Girls Lacrosse: Sunset League; Girls Tennis, Water Polo, Girls Volleyball Beach Volleyball: Sunset Surf League; Basketball, Cross Country, Golf, Soccer, Swimming, Tennis, Track, Boys Volleyball, Wrestling: Sunset Wave League.

MTV reality series
In 2004, MTV created a reality television show titled Laguna Beach: The Real Orange County, which aired for three seasons. The show follows the lives of several young Laguna Beach residents as they finish high school and begin the next chapter of their lives. It ran for three very successful seasons and became the second highest rated show on the network. It made Laguna alumni Lo Bosworth, Kristin Cavallari, Stephen Colletti, and Lauren Conrad into celebrities.

Notable alumni

Blair Anderson - Under Secretary for Policy in the U.S. Department of Transportation
Damon Berryhill –  Major League Baseball player
Dain Blanton –  Olympian 2000, gold medal beach volleyball
Lo Bosworth - reality television personality
Jason Derek Brown – one of FBI Ten Most Wanted Fugitives
Katherine Cannon - Actress
Kristin Cavallari - reality television personality
Stephen Colletti - reality television personality
Lauren Conrad - reality television personality
Clyde Cook - president of Biola University
Lucas Connor - musician (Younger Hunger)
Mikal Cronin – musician and songwriter
Tony Davia – musician (Younger Hunger)
Annika Dries – Olympian 2012, gold medal women's water polo
Dusty Dvorak – Olympian 1984, gold medal indoor volleyball
Aria Fischer - Olympian 2016, gold medal women's water polo
Makenzie Fischer - Olympian 2016, gold medal women's water polo
Scott Fortune – Olympian 1988, gold medal indoor volleyball, 1992 bronze medal, 1996 Olympian
David Folkenflik – media correspondent, National Public Radio
Taylor Hawkins – drummer, member of the Foo Fighters
Eric Hulst - distance runner 
Jun Falkenstein - Hollywood Director
Rick Leach – tennis pro, 1990 Wimbledon doubles champion
Billy Mohler – musician
Tom Morey – inventor of the modern foam body board "Morey Boogie Board"
John Pitts – NFL player 1967–1975, first round draft pick - Buffalo Bills
Ty Segall – musician
James Patrick Stuart – actor (All My Children)
Rachel Wacholder - model and beach volleyball player
Paul J. Watford - United States Circuit Judge
Alicia Leigh Willis – actress
Nate Wood – musician

References

External links
Laguna Beach High School

High schools in Orange County, California
Laguna Beach, California
Public high schools in California
1934 establishments in California
Educational institutions established in 1934